Japanese holdouts were soldiers of the Imperial Japanese Army and Imperial Japanese Navy during the Pacific Theatre of World War II who continued fighting after the surrender of Japan at the end of the war. Japanese holdouts either doubted the veracity of the formal surrender, were not aware that the war had ended because communications had been cut off by Allied advances, or were bound by honor to never surrender.

After Japan officially surrendered at the end of World War II, Japanese holdouts in Southeast Asia and the Pacific islands that had been part of the Japanese Empire continued to fight local police, government forces, and Allied troops stationed to assist the newly formed governments. Many holdouts were discovered in the jungles of Southeast Asia and the Pacific over the following decades, with the last verified holdout, Private Teruo Nakamura, surrendering on the island of Morotai in 1974. Newspapers throughout East Asia and the Pacific reported more holdouts and searches for them were conducted until 2005, but the evidence was too scant, and no further holdouts were confirmed.

Some Japanese soldiers acknowledged Japan's surrender and the end of World War II but were reluctant to demobilize and wished to continue armed combat for ideological reasons. Many fought in the Chinese Civil War, the Korean War, and local independence movements in Southeast Asia such as the First Indochina War and the Indonesian National Revolution, and these Japanese soldiers are not usually considered holdouts.

History

Individuals

Groups

 Captain Sakae Ōba, who led his company of 46 men in guerrilla actions against United States troops following the Battle of Saipan, surrendered on December 1, 1945, three months after the war ended.

 On January 1, 1946, 20 Japanese Army personnel who had been hiding in a tunnel at Corregidor Island surrendered to a U.S. serviceman after learning the war had ended from a newspaper found while collecting water.

 Lieutenant Ei Yamaguchi and his 33 soldiers emerged on Peleliu in late March 1947, attacking the U.S. Marine Corps detachment stationed on the island believing the war was still being fought. Reinforcements were sent in, along with a Japanese admiral who was able to convince them the war was over. They finally surrendered in April 1947.

 On May 12, 1948, the Associated Press reported that two unnamed Japanese soldiers had surrendered to civilian policemen in Guam the day before.

 On June 27, 1951, the Associated Press reported that a Japanese petty officer who surrendered on Anatahan Island in the Marianas two weeks before said that there were 18 other holdouts there. A U.S. Navy plane that flew over the island spotted 18 Japanese soldiers on a beach waving white flags. However, the Navy remained cautious, as the Japanese petty officer had warned that the soldiers were "well-armed and that some of them threatened to kill anyone who tried to give himself up. The leaders profess to believe that the war is still on." The Navy dispatched a seagoing tug, the Cocopa, to the island in hopes of picking up some or all of the soldiers without incident. After a formal surrender ceremony, all the men were retrieved. The Japanese occupation of the island inspired the 1953 film Anatahan and the 1998 novel Cage on the Sea.

 In 1955, four Japanese airmen surrendered at Hollandia in Dutch New Guinea: Shimada Kakuo, Shimokubo Kumao, Ojima Mamoru and Jaegashi Sanzo. They were the survivors of a bigger group.

 In 1956, nine soldiers were discovered and sent home from Morotai.

 In November 1956, four men surrendered on the island of Mindoro: Lieutenant Shigeichi Yamamoto and the Corporals Unitaro Ishii, Masaji Izumida and Juhie Nakano.

Alleged sightings (1981–2005)
In 1981, a Diet of Japan committee mentioned newspaper reports that holdouts were still living in the forest on Vella Lavella in the Solomon Islands. Searches for holdouts were conducted by the Japanese government on many Pacific islands throughout the 1980s, but the information was too scant to take any further action, and the searches ended by 1989. The last report taken seriously by Japanese officials took place in May 2005, when two elderly men emerged from the jungle in the Philippians claiming to be ex-soldiers. It was initially assumed that the media attention scared the two men off as they disappeared and were not heard from again. Suspicions of a hoax or a kidnapping attempt later mounted as the area where the alleged soldiers emerged from is "notorious" for ransom kidnappings and attacks by Muslim separatists. It is unknown how many or if any legitimate Japanese holdouts remain today. The National WWII Museum reported in 2022 that surviving veterans are "dying quickly", as those who served are now "in their 90s or older".

See also
 Volunteer Fighting Corps, planned Japanese resistance post-occupation
 Shindo Renmei, Brazilian Japanese emigres refusing to believe Japan's surrender
 Siege of Baler, Spanish soldiers in the Philippines who refused to believe the end of the Philippine Revolution and SpanishAmerican war

Post World War II resistance
 Cursed soldiers, Polish post-World War II resistance fighters
 Forest Brothers, Baltic post-World War II resistance fighters
 Werwolf, planned German resistance World War II post-occupation

References

External links
 Holdouts
 Two more Japanese holdouts in the Philippines
 Final Straggler: the Japanese soldier who outlasted Hiroo Onoda

Aftermath of World War II in Japan
History of Guam
Japan in World War II
Pacific theatre of World War II
World War II resistance movements